Mohamed Traoré Diarra (born 29 November 1994), commonly known as Moha, is a Spanish professional footballer who plays as a forward. 

In a journeyman career, he played 15 games and scored once in the Segunda División for Córdoba and Cádiz, but spent most of his years in the lower leagues. He also had a brief spell in Croatia's top flight with Istra 1961

Club career
Born in Barcelona, Catalonia, Moha joined RCD Espanyol's youth setup in January 2012, after spells at CF Badalona and CE L'Hospitalet. He made his senior debut with the reserves during the campaign, winning promotion from Tercera División.

After being rarely used, Moha returned to Badalona in July 2013, on loan for one year. In January of the following year he was loaned to AE Prat, also of the Segunda División B.

On 12 July 2014, Moha signed for another reserve team, Elche CF Ilicitano also in the third tier. The following March, he was an unused substitute for the first team's La Liga game at RC Celta de Vigo because of Jonathas' injury, and in July 2015 he moved to Córdoba CF, being assigned to its B-team in the fourth division.

Moha made his professional debut on 13 March 2016, coming on as a half-time substitute for Luso in a 2–1 home loss against CD Lugo in the Segunda División. On 25 June 2017, after impressing with the reserves, he signed a three-year contract with Cádiz CF also in the second tier. Never a starter, he scored once in his season there, coming on late and confirming a 4–1 win over fellow Andalusians Sevilla Atlético at the Estadio Ramón de Carranza on 10 March 2018.

In August 2018, Moha left Spain for the first time in his career, signing for NK Istra 1961 of the Croatian First Football League. In 15 total games for the team from Pula he scored once, in a 4–2 cup first round win away to NK Sloga Nova Gradiška.

In January 2019 Moha returned to Spain's third tier on loan at UD Melilla. After helping the team from the North African exclave to the play-offs, he moved across the division to sign for Hércules CF in July.

Moha rescinded his contract with Hércules one year early in August 2020, and signed for Recreativo de Huelva. His participation at the club was delayed for a month, until he recovered from COVID-19. He played only six times, scoring once, as the club suffered a double relegation to the Tercera División RFEF due to a league restructuring. In June 2021, he returned to his native region and signed for UE Cornellà, two leagues above.

International career
Born in Spain, Moha switched allegiance to Mali on 17 February 2014.

On 20 March 2015, he was called up to the full squad for friendlies against Gabon and Ghana, but did not appear in either match.

Personal life
Moha's younger brother, Adama, is also a footballer.

References

External links

1994 births
Living people
Spanish people of Malian descent
Spanish sportspeople of African descent
Footballers from Barcelona
Spanish footballers
Malian footballers
Association football forwards
Segunda División players
Segunda División B players
Tercera División players
RCD Espanyol B footballers
CF Badalona players
AE Prat players
Elche CF Ilicitano footballers
Córdoba CF B players
Córdoba CF players
Cádiz CF players
UD Melilla footballers
Hércules CF players
Recreativo de Huelva players
UE Cornellà players
Croatian Football League players
NK Istra 1961 players
Spanish expatriate footballers
Malian expatriate footballers
Spanish expatriate sportspeople in Croatia
Expatriate footballers in Croatia